Lazzat Un Nisa (from  The Pleasure of Woman) is an erotic Indian anecdote, in the Urdu and Persian language. It depicts the art of sex through the role of jewellery and perfume in lovemaking, erotic writing as literature, and pornography as aphrodisiac. The Book was hand-illustrated and hand-copied in Urdu and Persian in 1850 by writer Mohammed Abdul Latif Muzdar Mehdune.

History
Published during the reign of Sultan Abdullah Qutub Shah, the original manuscript was completed in 1646 AD, with 26 pages in the form of a book with 10 chapters, written by Mohammed Shah Jami, under the supervision of Royal physician Hakim Nizamuddin. It is speculated that Lazzat Un Nisa is originally a translation of 11th Century Sanskrit book Koka Shastra, though the translation work was not named, some intellectuals started referring to it as Lazzat Un Nisa.

In the fifteenth century, the Hindu court of Bidar patronized such erotic works as the Thadkirat al-Shahawat (List of aphrodisiacs) and Sringara Manjari (erotic Bouquets). Lizzat Un Nisa is one of the few surviving erotics works from the period. There is another Kitab ul-Laddhat un-nisa which was written for a certain vizir Kukapondat by the same content and translated from Parsi into Russian. Actually the book itself has no pornographic or explicit sexual bias. It gives instructions how to classify women from their outer aspect starting from their apparel and ending with some parts of their body. In the Middle Ages Central Asia was the most important urbanized complex of cities and the area thrived of scientific research especially in the medical and therapeutic sciences (Avicenna and Rhazes were born there) and therefore it is very interesting to read which, maybe for a man living in these frantic cities, unexpected defaults could show up in the sexual life when making acquaintance with ladies and how he/she could recur to be treated by a doctor and by which special medical recipes. Lately this book became available in Italian with historical comments as per attached bibliography.

A copy of the original manuscript was last seen in the state museum in Public Gardens in Hyderabad.

Story
The main subject of the story is a man named Harichand, who under orders of a king, embarks on a journey to collect exotic gifts and beautiful women for the pleasures of the king. The manuscript provides advice on various sexual techniques.  It has a section on how to arouse a woman and observations based on sizes of a woman's vagina  and also a brief list of lengths of the phallus.

The book has couplets on the nature of men and the qualities of men and women. It has as many as 30 couplets describing Padmini, the woman with the most excellent qualities among the four types of women described.

It has chapters on other three women types — Chetani, Sankhini and Hastini. Then there are separate couplets on different methods one should adopt with each of the four women types. It also deals with the nerves that have sexual stimulation, besides precautions to be observed during pregnancy.

References

6. Aldo C. Marturano/Haidar Bababekov/Mahmud Hasanov - LE VIRTÙ ATTRATTIVE DELLE DONNE, www.Lulu.com 2016

External links
 Lazzat-un-nisa Hyderabads own kamasutra back in focus,by Syed Akbar, Times of India 5 January 2019

Sex manuals
Indian literature
1850 books
Sexuality in India
Indian manuscripts
19th-century Indian books